Stephen John Daniels  (born 11 May 1950) is a British cultural geographer. He was Professor of Cultural Geography, and is now Emeritus Professor, at the University of Nottingham. In 2015, he received the prestigious Victoria Medal from the Royal Geographical Society which is awarded "for conspicuous merit in research in geography".

Daniels studied at the University of St Andrews and the University of Wisconsin–Madison, before completing a PhD at University College London examined by Denis Cosgrove. He joined the University of Nottingham as a lecturer in 1980.

His research interests include the history of landscape representation, design and management, the landscape arts of eighteenth century Britain, the history of geographical knowledge and imagination. His books include the highly influential The Iconography of Landscape (1988) edited with Denis Cosgrove, Fields of Vision (1992), and Humphrey Repton: Landscape Gardening and the Geography of Georgian England (1999), and the exhibition catalogues Art of the Garden (2004) and Paul Sandby: Picturing Britain (2009). He has curated exhibitions at the Tate and Royal Academy of Arts.

He has been recognised as a Fellow of the British Academy, Fellow of the Academy of Social Sciences, Fellow of the Society of Antiquaries of London and Fellow of the Royal Geographical Society.

References

1950 births
Living people
Academics of the University of Nottingham
Alumni of the University of St Andrews
Alumni of the University of London
Alumni of University College London
University of Wisconsin–Madison alumni
Fellows of the Royal Geographical Society
Fellows of the British Academy
Fellows of the Academy of Social Sciences
Fellows of the Society of Antiquaries of London
British geographers
Human geographers
Historical geographers
Cultural geographers
21st-century geographers
20th-century geographers
English art historians
21st-century English educators
20th-century English educators
Victoria Medal recipients